Southern English may refer to:

English in southern England, English language in Southern England
Southern American English, English language in The South of the United States

See also
 Northern English (disambiguation)